Cricket in Bihar may refer to : 

 Bihar Cricket Association
 Bihar cricket team
 Bihar Cricket team in Vijay Hazare Trophy
 Bihar cricket team in Ranji Trophy
 Bihar cricketers